The International Journal of Discrimination and the Law is a quarterly peer-reviewed academic journal covering the field of law in connection with discrimination. The issues covered in this journal include racism and sex discrimination, the treatment of asylum-seekers and refugees, immigration and nationality, discrimination on grounds disability, sexual or political orientation, age and ill-health, in relation to access to employment, housing, education and other services. The editors-in-chief are Nicole Busby (University of Glasgow) and Grace James (University of Reading). It was established in 1995 and is currently published by SAGE Publications.

Abstracting and indexing 
The International Journal of Discrimination and the Law is abstracted and indexed in:
 Criminal Justice Abstracts
 PsycINFO
 Social Services Abstracts
 Scopus

External links 
 

SAGE Publishing academic journals
English-language journals
Law journals
Quarterly journals
Publications established in 1995